The 1980 Summer Paralympics, branded as the Olympics for the Disabled, were the sixth Summer Paralympic Games. They were held in Arnhem, Netherlands, from 21 to 30 June 1980.

Background

The Soviet Union, hosts of the 1980 Summer Olympics, were invited to host these Paralympics. However, disability sport was not there, and they passed; notoriously, a statement was issued denying the existence of any disabled people in the country people (labelled "invalids" by Soviet officials). Soviet Paralympic teams were first represented in the 1988 Summer and Winter Games, also the last while the Soviet Union was extant. The first Paralympics on former Soviet territory would be in 2014.

There was controversy during the preparation for these Games over the inclusion of a team from South Africa. In the Netherlands, public and official opinion was against the inclusion of the South African team and pressure came from a number of sports organisations against the Organising Committee. The Dutch Parliament was negative as well. Eventually, the parliament decided against allowing the participation of the South African team. Although "much of the publicity relating to the South African participation had been negative, it did succeed in bringing the disabled sports movement into the minds of many people who would not have otherwise considered the subject at all. Dutch organisers also increased visibility through their fundraising ... building a fund that would hold a surplus years after the games. This would naturally find its expression in the International Fund Sport Disabled, supporting the future of the paralympic movement in the 1980s."

Sports 
Competitors were divided into four disability categories: amputee, cerebral palsy, visually impaired, and wheelchair. It was the first time that cerebral palsy athletes competed in the Paralympics. Volleyball was added to the program as a new sport.

 Archery
 Athletics
 Dartchery
 Goalball
 Lawn bowls
 Shooting
 Swimming
 Table tennis
 Volleyball
 Weightlifting
 Wheelchair basketball
 Wheelchair fencing
 Wrestling

Participating delegations 
Forty-three delegations took part in the Arnhem Paralympics. Iceland, Kuwait and Sudan made their first appearances.

Prior to the Games, the States General (national Parliament) of the Netherlands, as host country, adopted a motion declaring South Africa's participation "undesirable", due to its policy of apartheid. The 1980 Games thus marked South Africa's first absence from the Summer Paralympics since it had joined the movement in 1964, and it remained absent until 1992. The Netherlands' decision thus corrected the anomaly whereby South Africa had been banned from the Olympic movement since 1960, while still being authorised to take part in the Paralympic Games.

Medal table 

The top 10 NPCs by number of gold medals are listed below. The host nation, Netherlands, is highlighted.

See also 

 1980 Summer Olympics
 1980 Winter Paralympics

References

External links
 International Paralympic Committee

 
Paralympic
Paralympics
Multi-sport events in the Netherlands
Paralympic Games
Summer Paralympic Games
June 1980 sports events in Europe
Sports competitions in Arnhem